Near the Beginning (ATCO Records 33–278) is the fourth album by the American psychedelic rock band Vanilla Fudge. It was released early 1969 and featured a cover of the Jr. Walker & the All Stars song "Shotgun".

The album peaked at #16 on the Billboard album charts in March 1969.

Track listing

Personnel
Carmine Appice - drums, vocals
Tim Bogert - bass, vocals
Vince Martell - guitar, vocals
Mark Stein - lead vocals, keyboards

References

Vanilla Fudge albums
1969 albums
Atco Records albums